Heidi Herzon is an American television producer who has served as a producer on Sarah Silverman: Jesus Is Magic and The Sarah Silverman Program.

References

External links 
 

American film producers
American television producers
American women television producers
Living people
Year of birth missing (living people)
21st-century American women